Matar is a large village in Kheda district in the Indian state of Gujarat. The headquarters of the Matar taluka, in the 2011 census it had a population of 15,284.

It was earlier known as Matbar, meaning a wealthy or prosperous village. This village has the well known Jain temple of Sachadev dedicated to Sumatinath , the fifth  Jain Tirthankara.

References

Cities and towns in Kheda district
Villages in Kheda district